AMV may refer to:

Media
 AMV (TV program), an Australian television series 
 AMV (TV station), an Australian television station 
 AMV video format, a proprietary video file format  
 Abbott Mead Vickers BBDO, a British advertising agency
 Anime music video, a video consisting of anime clips arranged to a song

Science
 Alfalfa mosaic virus, a plant virus of the family Bromoviridae
 Anterior medullary velum, a part of the structure of the brain
 Avian myeloblastosis virus, a virus of the genus Alpharetrovirus

Other
 AMV, the IATA airport code for Amderma Airport (Амдерма), Russia
 A Motley Vision, a Mormon criticism blog
 Abandoned medieval village, another designation for the UK's deserted medieval villages (DMVs)
 Patria AMV, a Finnish military vehicle